The 2013 Pacific Mini Games was the ninth edition of these Mini Games. They were held in Mata Utu in Wallis and Futuna from 2 to 12 September 2013.

Participating countries and territories
There were 22 nations at the 2013 games:

* Note: The Marshall Islands team returned to compete at these Games after not participating in the 2009 Pacific Mini Games.

Sports
Eight sports were contested for these games. Number of events for each sport is in brackets.

 
  Beach volleyball (2)
  Rugby sevens (1)
  
  
  Outrigger canoe (Va'a) (12)
  Volleyball (2)
  Weightlifting  (14)

Venues
 Stade de Mata-Utu (also named as Stade de Kafika) – opening and closing ceremonies, athletics, and rugby sevens
 Kolopelu Place (Futuna Island) - beach volleyball
 Kafika Hall – taekwondo, volleyball, and weightlifting
 Bay of Gahi (beside the village of Gahi on Wallis Island) - va'a (outrigger canoe)
 Tekaviki Island (northeast from Mata-Utu on Wallis Island) – sailing

Calendar

Medal table
Key:
NOTE: This ranking does not include the six events in sailing, due to final results not present at the official website.

References

External links
 
 2013 Pacific Mini Games description
 Official Program 

 
Pacific Games by year
Pacific Games
Pacific
Pacific
Sports competitions in Wallis and Futuna
Pacific Mini Games